Gamma-aminobutyric acid receptor subunit beta-1 is a protein that in humans is encoded by the GABRB1 gene.

Function 
The gamma-aminobutyric acid A receptor (GABAA receptor) is a multisubunit chloride channel that mediates the fastest inhibitory synaptic transmission in the central nervous system. This gene encodes GABA A receptor, beta 1 subunit. It is mapped to chromosome 4p12 in a cluster of genes encoding alpha 4, alpha 2 and gamma 1 subunits of the GABAA receptor. Alteration of this gene is implicated in the pathogenetics of schizophrenia.

Clinical significance
Mice bearing mutant copies of this gene have been shown to be vulnerable to binge drinking of alcohol.

See also
 GABAA receptor

References

Further reading

External links 
 

Ion channels